= 1946–47 Plunket Shield season =

Cricket tournament in New Zealand

1946-47 Plunket Shield
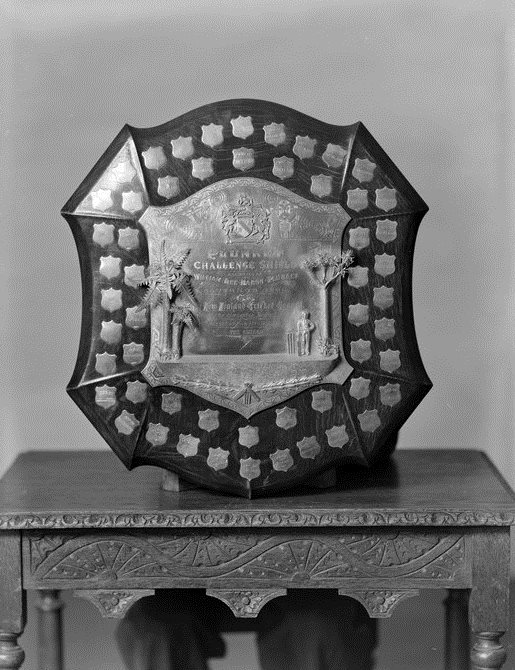
- The Plunket Shield trophy
- Cricket format: First-class
- Tournament format(s): Round-robin
- Champions: Auckland (9th title)
- Participants: 4
- Matches: 6

The 1946–47 Plunket Shield season was a tournament of the Plunket Shield, the domestic first-class cricket competition of New Zealand.

Auckland won the championship, finishing at the top of the points table at the end of the round-robin tournament between the four first-class sides, Auckland, Canterbury, Otago and Wellington. Eight points were awarded for a win, four points for having a first innings lead in a draw and two points for a first innings deficit in a draw.

== Table ==
Below are the Plunket Shield standings for the season:

| Team | Played | Won | Lost | Drawn | Points | NetRpW |
|---|---|---|---|---|---|---|
| Auckland | 3 | 2 | 0 | 1 | 18 | 4.951 |
| Wellington | 3 | 1 | 1 | 1 | 12 | -0.102 |
| Otago | 3 | 1 | 1 | 1 | 10 | 1.816 |
| Canterbury | 3 | 0 | 2 | 1 | 4 | -4.460 |
